The Gore Highway is a highway running between Toowoomba and Goondiwindi in Queensland, Australia. Together with Goulburn Valley Highway and Newell Highway, it is a part of the National Highway's Melbourne-Brisbane link. It is signed as National Highway A39.

History
The highway is named after two brothers, St. George Richard Gore and Ralph Thomas Gore who established the Yandilla pastoral run in the area (between Pittsworth and Milmerran), through which the road traverses.

It was elevated to National Highway status in February 1993, and replaced the Cunningham Highway as the main route between Goondiwindi and Brisbane. Interstate traffic was rerouted through Toowoomba and the Warrego Highway as it presented a less steep gradient than via Warwick and Cunninghams Gap, shortening travel time especially for trucks. It was initially designated State Route 85 until February 1993 when National Highway 85  was proclaimed, splitting State Route 85 into two. In 2005 it was given the National Highway A39 designation.

The Toowoomba Bypass was completed in September 2019. It bypasses the urban area of Toowoomba and provides a better crossing of the Great Dividing Range. Gore Highway (A39) was rerouted via the bypass between Athol (in the south) and the Warrego Highway (A2) interchange at Charlton. The original section of Gore Highway to Toowoomba was renamed Toowoomba Athol Road (A139).

Route description
The highway passes through Queensland's Darling Downs region. Typical of the scenery are grazing cattle, orchards and grain farmland. It is concurrent with State route 85 from Goondiwindi to Athol, and with State route 82 from Milmerran to Pampas.

Speed zones
The highway has two different speed zones.

Towns and localities
 Goondiwindi
Billa Billa
Wyaga
Kindon
Bulli Creek
Wattle Ridge
The Pines
Condamine Farms
Cypress Gardens
Forest Ridge
Millmerran Downs
Captains Mountain
 Millmerran
Yandilla
 Pittsworth
 Linthorpe
 Broxburn
 Southbrook
 Umbiram
 Athol
 Charlton

Roads of Strategic Importance upgrades
The Roads of Strategic Importance initiative, last updated in March 2022, includes the following projects for the Gore Highway.

Road upgrades
A lead project to upgrade Queensland sections of the Toowoomba to Seymour corridor, including the Gore Highway and surrounding state and council roads, at an estimated cost of $62.5 million, was to commence in 2020 and is scheduled for completion in mid-2028.

Road surface rehabilitation
A project for surface rehabilitation of a section of the Gore Highway between Pittsworth and Millmerran at a cost of $17 million is planned to be completed by mid-2023.

Other upgrades
A project to plan safety upgrades on the Gore Highway and the Toowoomba - Athol Road, at a cost of $400,000, was completed in December 2021.

Major intersections

Toowoomba Athol Road (A139)

The Toowoomba Athol Road is a  former section of the Gore Highway that runs south-west from the city of Toowoomba in Queensland, Australia. With the opening of the Toowoomba Bypass in 2019 the Gore Highway was redirected to part of it, and the bypassed section of the highway was renamed Toowoomba Athol Road and assigned the route number A139.

A139 Route description
The road commences at an intersection with the Toowoomba Connection Road (A21) on the midpoint of the Toowoomba suburbs of Newtown and Harristown. It runs south-west through the residential suburb of Harristown and the rural suburbs of Drayton and Westbrook to the rural locality of Athol, where it ends at an intersection with the Gore Highway. It is concurrent with State Route 85. There are no major intersections on this road.

A139 History
Located where two swampy creeks converged as the headwaters of Gowrie Creek, this area was known as The Swamp/s or the Drayton Swamp, and later as Toowoomba.
When preparing the detailed survey of Drayton in 1850, Burnett added a cemetery to the north of the village, midway between Drayton town and the Drayton Swamp suburban allotments, on slightly elevated land close to the road connecting the two settlements. This road, later named Anzac Avenue, is now part of Toowoomba Athol Road.

The Toowoomba Bypass was completed in September 2019 and bypasses the urban area of Toowoomba and provides a better crossing of the Great Dividing Range. The Warrego Highway (A2) was rerouted via the bypass between Helidon Spa (in the east) and an interchange at Charlton (in the west). The Gore Highway (A39) was rerouted via the bypass between Charlton and Athol, and the  original section of Gore Highway from Toowoomba to Athol was renamed Toowoomba Athol Road (A139).

See also

 Highways in Australia
 List of highways in Queensland
 List of highways numbered 85
 Drayton and Toowoomba Cemetery

References

Highways in Queensland